Pivot is a casual card game released by Wizards of the Coast in 1998. The game was designed by André François. Pivot, along with Alpha Blitz, Go Wild!, and Twitch, were part of a move by Wizards of the Coast to diversify beyond their core Magic: The Gathering property. This game is no longer in print.

There are 108 cards in a Pivot deck:
    80 Number cards (numbered 1 - 80)
    28 Direction cards (11 Up, 11 Down, and 6 Pivot)

The object of the game is to be the first player to get rid of all their cards.

When playing, it is useful to have two play piles: one for Number cards, and the other for Direction cards. Play travels around in a circle depending on the direction indicated on the last played Direction card. The Direction cards also indicate which Number cards can be played. An Up Direction card indicates Number cards with a value higher than the last played Number card, while Down indicates lower valued Number cards. The Pivot Direction card can be played to change the direction of play. A player may play any one of these cards on their turn. If they cannot play a card, that player must draw one card from the draw pile.

For example, if the direction is Up and the last played Number card was 42, valid plays are any Number card higher than 42, a Down card, or a Pivot card (which would have the same effect as a Down card).

External links 
 

Card games introduced in 1998
Wizards of the Coast games
Dedicated deck card games
Shedding-type card games